Obo Airport may refer to:

 Obo Airport (Papua New Guinea) in Obo, Papua New Guinea
 M'Boki Airport in Obo, Central African Republic
 Poste Airport in Obo, Central African Republic